Associazione sportiva dilettantistica – Nogometni klub Kras Repen, or simply Kras Repen or Kras, is a semi-professional Italian association football club located in Repen, a village in the comune of Monrupino, Friuli-Venezia Giulia. The fanbase of the club is the Slovene community that populate the Friuli-Venezia Giulia region. The president of the club is Goran Kocman.

Kras in Slovene means Karst.

History
The Kras Football Club was formally established in Repen, part of the municipality of Monrupino, in 1986.

The partnership was born from the ashes of the football section of Olimpija, a club founded in the hamlet of Gabrovizza, in Sgonico. In 1974 the section passed to the Kras Sports Club in Sgonico, a sports club that also boasts a volleyball and table tennis section.

The home games of CS Kras, a team that plays in Terza Categoria (the lowest in Italy), are played on the Repen pitch.

1986 is the year of the turning point. The football section detaches itself from the defensive sports club becoming an independent association: under the presidency of Andrej Race the Football Club Kras is born. The red and white team plays in Terza and Seconda Categoria until the 2004-05 season, when the club, then chaired by Domenico Centrone, wins promotion to Prima Categoria with a perfect score. That historic result starts an extraordinary five-year period. Already in the following season Kras makes another leap in category by accessing the Promozione. After two years finished on the threshold of the play-offs. In 2007–08, the club was coached by former Soviet Union and Belarus international player Sergei Aleinikov. The contact was made due to the club's main sponsor, Koimpex, working with companies in Belarus. In the 2008-09 season Kras dominated the tournament, obtaining its first promotion to Eccellenza.

The following season, the terrible red furies of the Karst obtained a resounding second place in the standings, thus winning the right to participate in the national play-offs to access to Serie D. The play-offs are a crescendo of emotions. In the semifinal Kras got the better of the Lombards from Verbano; in the double final, however, Monrupino's team beat Jesina 3-0 in the first leg, then losing 3-2 in the Marche region, an irrelevant defeat: Kras landed for the first time in its history in Serie D.

In the first season on the threshold of professionalism (2010-2011) the Kras does not go beyond the 17th place, relegating to Eccellenza. The following year, however, the team of president Goran Kocman won the league, immediately regaining the D series.

In the 2012-2013 season the team is still unable to withstand the impact of the leap in the category: the red and white finish penultimate and relegated back to Excellence. The partnership, however, does not give up. President Kocman sets up what he himself will call the strongest team Kras has ever had. History will prove him right: the team arrives in second position, winning the right to the national play-offs. In the double semifinal the boys coached by Predrag Arčaba eliminate Libarna Calcio (Piedmont) without major worries. In the final, the Monrupino team faces the La Spezia team of Magra Azzurri. In Liguria, in Sarzana, Kras Repen masterfully imposes itself for 2-0.

On 15 June 2014, at the municipal stadium of Monrupino, in front of an audience of almost 1000 spectators, the red and white impacted for 2-2 against the Ligurians: the red furies of the Karst won their third historic promotion in Serie D.

The third season in Serie D, is still stingy with joys for the team of president Goran Kocman. At the beginning of the season the team was entrusted to Predrag Arčaba, but before the end of 2014 the player Anton Žlogar was called on the bench. Despite a good second round, the red and white arrive third to last so as to be forced to play the play-out salvation on the Giorgione field. In Castelfranco Veneto the rossostellati won 2-1, condemning Kras Repen to be relegated to Eccellenza.

In the 2015-2016 season the team restarts from Anton Žlogar. After a good start, the red and white formation begins to lose more and more points ending up close to the hot zone of the standings. Žlogar resigns and sports director Radenko Kneževič is called in his place. The historic Kras Repen bomber leads the team towards a good league final that brings the red Furies of the Karst up to sixth place.

In 2016-2017, coach Gianni Tortolo was initially called upon to direct the team. After a few days the helm passes into the hands of Radenko Kneževič. The team finishes the championship in sixth place dragged by goals from Žiga Smrtnik, top scorer of the tournament.

In 2017-2018 the team is again entrusted to Radenko Kneževič. The team starts the championship well and is in the top after six match-days. Then come eight defeats in the next ten match-days: in the first half season Kras scores only 14 points. In the second half, things are no better. The red and white close the regular season in third from bottom, snatching the chance to play for the play-out on the last day. On 13 May at the "Cudiz Stadion" in Corno di Rosazzo the team faces Virtus Corno: Kras must win or are relegated to the Promotion. In the second half Milan Grujić leads his team, but Grion responds to the hosts. In extra time, Damir Hadžić's goal and an own goal allow Kras to remain in Eccellenza.

In 2018-2019 the manager Radenko Kneževič is reconfirmed. The team struggles to achieve results, so much so that they find themselves in last place at the end of the first round with 11 points, as Fontanafredda and Lignano. In the second half season, thanks also to the inclusion of three new players - Christian Menichini, Bojan Djukić and Dalibor Radujko - the team begins to move up the rankings, but also thanks to the injury to the bomber Menichini, ends up closing the regular season in fourth from bottom with 31 points. The gap from the third to last, Fontanafredda, however, is only 3 points: they therefore go to the play-out. Sunday 12 May Kras awaits the Rossoneri at Repen's "Sakabar" for the one-off match that is worth staying in Eccellenza. On a practically winter day the red and white lost 2-1 (own goal by Goran Kerpan, momentary equal to Radujko and Rossoneri goal 10 minutes from the end) relegating to Promozione after 10 years between Eccellenza and Serie D.

Recent seasons

Honours
 Eccellenza Friuli-Venezia Giulia (1st regional level)
Winners: 2011–12
 Promozione Friuli-Venezia Giulia (2nd regional level)
Winners: 2008–09
 Seconda Categoria Friuli-Venezia Giulia (4th regional level)
Winners: 2004–05
 Terza Categoria Friuli-Venezia Giulia (5th and lowest regional level)
Winners: 2000–01

Club rivalries 
The arch-rivals of Kras are A.Š.D. Vesna from Santa Croce di Trieste.

See also 
 Slovene minority in Italy

References

External links
 Official website 

Football clubs in Italy
Football clubs in Friuli-Venezia Giulia
Association football clubs established in 1986
1986 establishments in Italy